KNOV-CD, virtual channel 41 (UHF digital channel 31), is a low-powered, Class A television station licensed to New Orleans, Louisiana, United States. The station is owned by Beach TV Properties, Inc.

Digital television
The station's digital signal is multiplexed:

References

External links
Official site

Television stations in New Orleans
Low-power television stations in the United States
Television channels and stations established in 1994